American Transportation Corporation (better known as AmTran) was an American manufacturer of school bus bodies.  Tracing its roots to Ward Body Works (established in 1933), AmTran was formed in 1980 following the 1979 bankruptcy of Ward to continue bus production.  In 1991, the company became a subsidiary of Navistar International, leading to a series of acquisitions of school bus body manufacturers by chassis suppliers during the 1990s.

As with its predecessor company, AmTran corporate headquarters and manufacturing facilities were located in Conway, Arkansas.  In 1999, the company opened an assembly facility in Tulsa, Oklahoma.  

In 2000, Navistar rebranded AmTran as part of International Truck and Bus, with vehicles taking on International branding.  During 2002, the branding changed again, as the name was changed to IC Corporation (IC Bus since 2008).

History
During the late 1970s, the school bus manufacturing industry was in relative turmoil.  From the early 1950s, the segment was dependent on student population growth related to the baby-boom generation.  By the beginning of the 1980s, the last of the generation had completed their secondary education, leading to a decrease in student population growth across the United States.

At the time, Ward Body Works was among "the Big Six" full-line school bus manufacturers (alongside Blue Bird, Carpenter, Superior, Thomas, and Wayne).  The declining economy of the late 1970s also cut into the profitability of all school bus manufacturers.  Of the "Big Six", Superior and Ward were the hardest hit.  Following the 1975 closure of its secondary manufacturing facility in Pennsylvania, Ward amassed over $20 million in debt by 1979.

1980s: Reorganization
In July 1980, Ward Industries filed for Chapter 11 bankruptcy. In the filing, the family-owned company declared $21.5 million in liabilities.  As Ward Industries was a significant manufacturer in the central Arkansas region, the Wards sought for a way to keep the doors of the company open.

With company president Charles Ward selling off his stake in the company, Ward Industries was acquired by an investment group (assisted by then-Arkansas Governor Bill Clinton) named MBH, Inc.  MBH was an acronym for the first letters of the last names of each of the 4 investors:  Thomas E "Mack" McLarty, J.W. "Buddy" Benafield and two Kansas City brothers, R.L. "Dick" Harmon and Robert Harmon.  McLarty and Benafield each held one-third ownership; the Harmon brothers together held the remaining one-third ownership.  MBH reopened Ward Industries as American Transportation Corporation (AmTran).  As Ward Industries continued to hold significant market share in the school bus segment, AmTran chose to retain the Ward brand name for school buses although non-school bus products adopted the AmTran brand in 1981.

Following the acquisition, the Ward family held no stake in AmTran; however, Steve Ward remained in the new company for vehicle distribution and marketing, having the exclusive rights to sell Ward/AmTran products in Arkansas, based in a dealership from Conway.

During the 1980s, AmTran would make several product introductions that would advance school bus design in several market segments.  Although among the last large bus manufacturers to introduce a Type A school bus, AmTran was the first manufacturer to introduce a higher-capacity version, with five rows of seating instead of four seen at the time.  For 1986, AmTran introduced the first large semi-forward control conventional with the introduction of the Ward/AmTran Patriot.  Using a shortened version of the Chevrolet/GMC B-Series, the Patriot allowed for a shorter wheelbase and nose angle for improved forward visibility.  Although not a success overall, the Patriot would go on to become a major influence on the later Thomas Vista.

In 1987, the structure of the Ward/AmTran body underwent an exterior update, distinguished by a rubrail mounted below the window line.  Much of the body structure remains in use in current-production IC Bus CE and RE-series product lines.

1990s: Acquisition and merger
 

In 1991, Navistar International acquired one-third of the stock of American Transportation Corporation; the purchase was initiated by Jerry Williams, the CEO of AmTran at the time.  As part of the purchase, Navistar acquired an option to buy the rest of AmTran, which was completed in April 1995.  The AmTran purchase marked the first purchase of a school bus body manufacturer by a chassis manufacturer or supplier, as several more were acquired during the late 1990s.   

Although AmTran had legally existed since 1981 and its non-school bus vehicles were branded as such, the company began to phase out the Ward brand following the Navistar purchase.  During 1992, the Ward Senator front-engine bus was updated, becoming the AmTran Genesis (with a Genesis by AmTran roof emblem).  At the end of 1992, the AmTran brand was phased in on other Ward school buses.  Navistar ownership also affected availability of school bus chassis; after 1991, the Volunteer body was produced nearly exclusively on the International 3800 chassis (Ford chassis remained a rarely ordered option through its 1998 discontinuation).       

For 1996 production, AmTran introduced its first all-new full-size bus, the AmTran RE.  The first rear-engine bus produced by AmTran or Ward in over 20 years, the RE broke from industry precedent in not sharing a common body design with the front-engine Genesis.  To focus on full-size buses exclusively, AmTran ended production of the Vanguard cutaway-chassis bus after 1996. 

For 1997, AmTran released the AmTran CS, the most extensive update to the Volunteer conventional since 1973.  The drivers' compartment was redesigned with updated controls and the flat windshield was replaced by a 4-piece design to improve forward visibility.   Following the discontinuation of the Ford B700/B800 after 1998, the International 3800 became the sole chassis for the AmTran CS (as the Freightliner FS-65 chassis was produced by the parent company of competitor Thomas Built Buses).
school bus

2000–2002: Rebranding to IC Corporation

In 1999, AmTran announced plans to build a second manufacturing facility in Tulsa, Oklahoma.  Dedicated to production of conventional-chassis school buses, the Tulsa factory was planned to employ nearly 1200 people as the factory opened in 2000.  Though still headquartered in Conway, the factory was now rededicated towards the lower-volume AmTran FE and RE-series product lines.

Following the introduction of Tulsa-produced buses, the AmTran CS was re-christened as the International IC.  Branded as a fully integrated conventional (pairing an International-sourced chassis, powertrain, and body), the IC underwent several design updates.  Compared to its AmTran CS predecessor, the IC saw a slightly redesigned windshield and another redesign of the drivers' compartment.  While sharing the International 3800 chassis with other body manufacturers, the IC body was further distinguished by a model-exclusive hood (receiving a vertical-slatted grille).    

During 2001, Navistar legally changed the name of its bus manufacturing subsidiary to "International Truck and Bus", effectively ending the existence of AmTran; into 2002 production, "American Transportation Corporation" lettering remained on vehicles.  The AmTran FE and AmTran RE adopted the identification of the International IC, replacing AmTran roof badging with "International" badging (with or without the International diamond emblem).  

For 2003, Navistar renamed its bus manufacturing subsidiary a second time in two years.  To better separate bus manufacturing from its truck manufacturing division, the company renamed International Truck and Bus as  Integrated Coach Corporation (IC Corporation, IC Bus since 2008).

Products

Facilities
AmTran buses were produced in the former Ward factory in Conway, Arkansas.  In 1999, the company expanded production capacity as it opened a second facility in Tulsa, Oklahoma.  Coinciding with the 2000 introduction of the IC-series, the Tulsa facility became home to all conventional-style bus bodies.  The Conway factory remained in production, manufacturing the FE and RE-Series transit-style bus bodies. 

After AmTran became IC Corporation (later IC Bus), the Conway facility ended full-scale bus production in January 2010 (following the discontinuation of the FE-Series); originally repurposed for parts fabrication and production, the factory was sold off by Navistar in 2014.

See also

 IC Bus - current iteration of successor IC Corporation
 Navistar International - parent company

References

Article with general overview of bus production in Conway, Arkansas

School bus manufacturers
Navistar International
Defunct manufacturing companies based in Arkansas
Vehicle manufacturing companies established in 1980
Vehicle manufacturing companies disestablished in 2002
1980 establishments in Arkansas
2002 disestablishments in Arkansas
Bus manufacturers of the United States
American companies established in 1980 
American companies disestablished in 2002